is a concert tour by Japanese singer Misia, and the tenth installment of the Hoshizora Live concert series. The tour began on June 17, 2018, at the Taipei International Convention Center in Taipei. The hall dates concluded on March 22, 2019, at the Fukuoka Sun Palace. Three arena dates were held at the Nippon Budokan on April 26 through April 28 to commemorate the transition from the Heisei era to the Reiwa era.

Background
On January 3, 2018, Misia announced that, in continuation of the 20th anniversary celebration, she will embark on a hall tour as part of the Hoshizora Live series. On January 10, 2018, she announced the first round of Japanese dates for the tour. On January 15, 2017, Misia added an additional date to the first leg of the tour in Japan, at the Hiroshima Bunka Gakuen HBG Hall in Hiroshima. On March 29, 2018, Misia announced the tour would begin with a concert in Taipei on June 17, 2018, at the Taipei International Convention Center, marking her first concert in Taiwan in five years. On April 23, 2018, five additional dates were added to the second leg of the tour, totaling sixteen shows over a three-month period. On May 2, 2018, the third leg of the tour, consisting of 21 shows, was announced to begin on October 10, 2018, at the Festival Hall in Osaka and conclude on February 20, 2019, at NHK Hall in Tokyo.

Shows

Cancelled shows

References

External links
 

2018 concert tours
2019 concert tours
Misia concert tours
Concert tours of Japan